The 2011–12 Indonesian Premier League season was the inaugural season of the Indonesian Premier League (IPL), a fully professional football competition that shared with the Indonesia Super League (ISL) as the top tier of the football league pyramid in Indonesia.

After the signing of the MoU between Djohar Arifin Husein (PSSI) and La Nyalla Matalitti (KPSI-PSSI) that was initiated by FIFA and the AFC through the AFC Task Force, now Indonesia Super League and Indonesian Premier League were under the control of the joint committee until the establishment of a new professional competition by the committee.

Teams

Stadium and locations

Personnel and kits

Note: Flags indicate national team as has been defined under FIFA eligibility rules. Players and Managers may hold more than one non-FIFA nationality.

Foreign players

Managerial changes

League table

Results

Goal scorers

Hat-tricks

Play-offs
The play-offs started on 26 November 2012.

References

 
Indo
1
Indonesian Premier League seasons